Bilinea bilineata is a moth of the family Erebidae first described by George Hampson in 1907. It is known from south-central Sri Lanka.

The species occurs in warm, moist forested mountains. Adults have been found in February, May, August, October and November, suggesting multiple generations per year.

The wingspan is 15–19 mm. The forewing is long, broad and light grey, with a prominent black medial area. The underside is greyish and brown, while the underside of the forewing is dark brownish and the underside of the hindwing greyish. The discal spot and postmedial line are well marked.

References

Micronoctuini
Moths described in 1907